Aoife Hoey (born 6 September 1983) is an Irish bobsledder who has competed since 2004. She finished 22nd out of 23 in the two-woman event at the 2005 FIBT World Championships in Calgary.
At , she was the tallest woman at the 2010 Winter Olympics.

Bobsleigh career
Aoife and her older sister Siobhán, teamed up in the Winter of 2002 – Aoife as pilot and Siobhain on brake. They received partial funding from the Olympic Council of Ireland but no commercial sponsorship. Following the worst possible start to the 2005–2006 Winter season (Serious injury) they narrowly missed out on qualification for the 2006 Winter Olympics. Teaming up with new recruit Jennifer Corcoran, for the 2007–08 bobsleigh season, Hoey qualified to compete in the European Bobsleigh Cup. She competed in the first two events of the season, finishing fifth at Igls on 22 November 2007  and 14th at Königssee on 29 November 2007.

Following a difficult season 2009–2010 racing in European Cup and World Cup events with brake athlete Claire Bergin, Hoey qualified for the Winter Olympic Games in Vancouver, British Columbia, Canada. She was named flagbearer for the Irish team at the opening ceremony of those games.

The bobsleigh team of Aoife Hoey and Claire Bergin finished in 17th place at the 2010 Winter Olympics. At a routine MRI scan at the Olympic village, three days before the competition, Hoey was diagnosed with endometriosis as well as three herniated discs in her back. She competed anyway, but announced her retirement from competitive sport shortly afterwards, to prevent further and potentially permanent spinal damage.

Athletics career
In 2005, she was Irish national outdoor champion in the triple jump. She also works for the Athletics Association of Ireland in the High Performance unit.

References

External links

1983 births
Living people
Bobsledders at the 2010 Winter Olympics
Irish female bobsledders
Olympic bobsledders of Ireland
Irish female triple jumpers
People with Endometriosis